Francisco Monteiro (3 February 1926 – 20 September 2002) was a Hong Kong freestyle swimmer. He competed in three events at the 1952 Summer Olympics.

References

External links
 

1926 births
2002 deaths
Hong Kong male freestyle swimmers
Olympic swimmers of Hong Kong
Swimmers at the 1952 Summer Olympics
Place of birth missing